During the 1940–41 English football season, Brentford competed in the Football League South, due to the cessation of competitive football for the duration of the Second World War. Though the Bees finished well down in the league placings, the club enjoyed some measure of success in the London War Cup, finishing as runners-up to Reading.

Season summary
In Brentford's first full season of wartime football during the Second World War, low crowds and takings of just £30–40 per match during the first half of the Football League South season brought about fears that the club would be unable to fulfil the remaining fixtures of the season. Manager Harry Curtis, backed by his directors, elected to carry on and welcome respite was found in the new London War Cup, in which the Bees advanced to the final, largely helped by 8 goals in five matches from guest forward Eddie Perry. Despite a further two goals for Perry in the final, Brentford finished as runners-up to Reading, losing 3–2 at Stamford Bridge.

League tables

Football League South

London War Cup Group A

Results
Brentford's goal tally listed first.

Legend

Football League South

Football League War Cup

London War Cup 

 Sources: 100 Years Of Brentford

Playing squad 
 Players' ages are as of the opening day of the 1940–41 season.

 Sources: Timeless Bees, Football League Players' Records 1888 to 1939, 100 Years Of Brentford

Coaching staff

Statistics

Appearances and goals

Players listed in italics left the club mid-season.
Source: 100 Years Of Brentford

Goalscorers 

Players listed in italics left the club mid-season.
Source: 100 Years Of Brentford

Wartime international caps

Management

Summary

Transfers & loans 
Guest players' arrival and departure dates correspond to their first and last appearances of the season.

Notes

References 

Brentford F.C. seasons
Brentford